Tom Lurich (1897 – November 1968) was a Polish professional wrestler.

Championships and accomplishments
 Professional wrestling
 Australian Heavyweight Championship (1 time)
 British Empire/Commonwealth Heavyweight Championship (1 time)

See also

References

1897 births
1968 deaths
Australian male professional wrestlers
Polish professional wrestlers
Place of birth missing